Journal Building may refer to:

Journal Building (Augusta, Maine), listed on the National Register of Historic Places (NRHP) in Kennebec County, Maine
Journal Building (Portland, Oregon), NRHP-listed